The 800 metres at the Summer Olympics has been contested since the first edition of the multi-sport event. The men's 800 m has been present on the Olympic athletics programme since 1896. The women's event was first held in 1928, making it the first distance running event for women. However it was not held again until 1960, since when it has been a permanent fixture. It is the most prestigious 800 m race at elite level. The competition format typically has three rounds: a qualifying round, semi-final stage, and a final between eight runners.

The Olympic records are held by David Rudisha, who ran a world record of 1:40.91 minutes in 2012, and Nadiya Olizarenko, who ran a former world record of 1:53.43 minutes in 1980. Olizarenko's mark is the joint longest-standing women's Olympic record (technically set three days after Ilona Slupianek's shot put record) and the joint second-longest after the men's long jump record by Bob Beamon. Her time remains the second fastest ever for the event. The 800 metres world record has been broken or equalled ten times at the Olympics; the men's record was broken in 1912, 1932, 1968, 1976 and 2012; the women's record was improved in 1928, 1960, 1964, 1976 and 1980.

Four men have won consecutive  800 m Olympic titles: Douglas Lowe (1924/1928), Mal Whitfield (1948/1952), Peter Snell (1960/1964), and Rudisha (2012/2016). Only Caster Semenya (2012/2016) has won the women's title twice, but Maria Mutola, Kelly Holmes and Pamela Jelimo have won gold and reached the podium twice. No athlete of either sex has won more than two medals. Historically, athletes in this event have also been successful at the 1500 metres at the Olympics. Holmes was the last athlete to win both events at the same Olympics in 2004.  2012 1500m gold medalist Taoufik Makhloufi made both podiums without winning gold in 2016.  Alberto Juantorena in 1976 also won the 400 metres gold medal in the same Olympics, only three other men and one woman have been able to get a medal in both events.

The United States is the most successful nation, having won nine gold medals & a total of 24 medals followed by Great Britain with eight gold & 12 medals overall and Kenya with six gold among its 15 medals.

Medal summary

Men

Multiple medalists

Medals by country

Women

Multiple medalists

Medalists by country

 The German total includes teams both competing as Germany and the United Team of Germany, but not East or West Germany.

Intercalated Games
The 1906 Intercalated Games were held in Athens and at the time were officially recognised as part of the Olympic Games series, with the intention being to hold a games in Greece in two-year intervals between the internationally held Olympics. However, this plan never came to fruition and the International Olympic Committee (IOC) later decided not to recognise these games as part of the official Olympic series. Some sports historians continue to treat the results of these games as part of the Olympic canon.

At this event a men's 800 m was held and Paul Pilgrim, a 1904 Olympic gold medalist in the 4-mile team race, won the competition. The reigning 800 m and 1500 metres champion from the 1904 Olympics, James Lightbody, was the runner-up and Britain's Wyndham Halswelle, later the 1908 Olympic champion, was the bronze medalist.

Non-canonical Olympic events
In addition to the main 1900 Olympic men's 800 metres, a handicap competition with thirteen entrants was contested three days after the final. Christian Christensen of Denmark was the winner in a time of 1:52.0 minutes with a 70 m handicap. Howard Hayes and Harvey Lord, both of the United States, filled out the top three, with Hayes recording 1:53.5 mins (45 m handicap) and Lord finishing in 1:54.2 minutes (35 m handicap).

A handicap 880-yard run (804.7 m) competition was held at 1904 Summer Olympics after the 1904 Olympic men's 800 m race. Johannes Runge of Germany won in 1:58.4 minutes with a 10-yard handicap. James Peck of Canada came second  in 1:59.0 minutes with zero handicap and  F. C. Roth, an American schoolboy, was third with a 15-yard headstart.

These events are no longer considered part of the official Olympic history of the 800 metres or the athletics programme in general. Consequently, medals from these competitions have not been assigned to nations on the all-time medal tables.

References
Participation and athlete data
Athletics Men's 800 metres Medalists. Sports Reference. Retrieved on 2014-02-07.
Athletics Women's 800 metres Medalists. Sports Reference. Retrieved on 2014-02-07.
Olympic record progressions
Mallon, Bill (2012). TRACK & FIELD ATHLETICS - OLYMPIC RECORD PROGRESSIONS. Track and Field News. Retrieved on 2014-02-07.
Specific

External links
IAAF 800 metres homepage
Official Olympics website
Olympic athletics records from Track & Field News

 
Olympics
800 metres